Julija Gotovskytė (born 20 January 1988) is a Lithuanian tennis player.

Gotovskytė has a career high WTA singles ranking of 759, achieved on 19 June 2006. She also has a career high WTA doubles ranking of 884, achieved on 22 May 2006.

ITF junior finals

Singles (1–0)

Doubles (1–2)

National representation

Fed Cup
Gotovskytė made her Fed Cup debut for Lithuania in 2007, while the team was competing in the Europe/Africa Zone Group I.

Fed Cup (0–7)

Singles (0–4)

Doubles (0–3)

References

External links
 
 
 

1988 births
Living people
Lithuanian female tennis players